Franklin Flying Field  is a privately owned, public use airport located three nautical miles (6 km) south of the central business district of Franklin, a city in Johnson County, Indiana, United States.

Facilities and aircraft 
Franklin Flying Field covers an area of 129 acres (52 ha) at an elevation of 740 feet (226 m) above mean sea level. It has one runway designated 3/21 with an asphalt surface measuring 2,400 by 35 feet (732 x 11 m).

There are 43 aircraft based at this airport: 95.3% single-engine, 2.3% multi-engine, and 2.3% helicopter.

References

External links 
 
 Aerial image as of March 1998 from USGS The National Map
 

Airports in Indiana
Transportation buildings and structures in Johnson County, Indiana